Tenkiller State Park is a  Oklahoma state park located in northwestern Sequoyah County, Oklahoma, near the city of Vian, Oklahoma. Larger cities nearby include Sallisaw, Muskogee and Webbers Falls, Oklahoma. 

The park adjoins Lake Tenkiller, which is the sixth-largest reservoir in Oklahoma, based on normal water capacity. 
Hunters in this area will find abundant deer, quail, dove, duck, geese, rabbit and squirrel.

The park is 1 of 7 Oklahoma State Parks that are in the path of totality for the 2024 solar eclipse, with 3 minute and 54 seconds of totality.

History
Tenkiller Ferry Lake, also known as Lake Tenkiller, was named after the Tenkillers, a prominent Cherokee family who owned the land in the area. The park was added to the Oklahoma State Park System in 1953, when the Oklahoma Tourism and Recreation Department (ORTD) leased land adjacent to the Tenkiller Ferry Project from the U. S. Army Corps of Engineers (USACE).

Ecology
The state park containks oak, timber, willow, sycamore, hackberry, elm, ash and birch. Wildlife includes deer, turkey, bobwhite quail, cottontail rabbits, squirrels, gray fox, coyote, bobcat, raccoon, skunk, mink and opossum. Bald eagles winter along Lake Tenkiller.

Attractions
Lake Tenkiller facilities include a scuba diving park, volleyball court, basketball court, shuffleboard court, horseshoe pit, amphitheater, playgrounds, community building, a swimming pool, nature center, group picnic shelters, swim beaches, kids' fishing pond, paved hiking trail and lighted boat ramps.

Guests may choose from 39 cabins, ranging from one to three bedroom styles.  All the cabins, except for the three bedroom model, are duplexes.  Cabins are equipped with dishes, linens, full kitchens, heat, air conditioning and satellite television.  Tenkiller State Park also offers courtyard cottages.  Each room features heat and air, a refrigerator and linens.  The park also features RV and tent campsites, as well as restrooms and showers.

Children 16 and under may catch their limit of three fish per day with no charge or permit required in the kids' fishing pond.  The park's Pine Cove Marina offers fuel, gifts, sportswear, snacks, repairs and boat slip rentals, as well as the floating Clearwater Cafe.  The underwater scuba diving park features underwater attractions ranging from a completely submerged school bus, various sunken boats, an aircraft fuselage and more.

Fees
To help fund a backlog of deferred maintenance and park improvements, the state implemented an entrance fee for this park and 21 others effective June 15, 2020.  The fees, charged per vehicle, start at $10 per day for a single-day or $8 for residents with an Oklahoma license plate or Oklahoma tribal plate.  Fees are waived for honorably discharged veterans and Oklahoma residents age 62 & older and their spouses.  Passes good for three days or a week are also available; annual passes good at all 22 state parks charging fees are offered at a cost of $75 for out-of-state visitors or $60 for Oklahoma residents.  The 22 parks are:
 Arrowhead Area at Lake Eufaula State Park
 Beavers Bend State Park
 Boiling Springs State Park
 Cherokee Landing State Park
 Fort Cobb State Park
 Foss State Park
 Honey Creek Area at Grand Lake State Park
 Great Plains State Park
 Great Salt Plains State Park
 Greenleaf State Park
 Keystone State Park
 Lake Eufaula State Park
 Lake Murray State Park
 Lake Texoma State Park
 Lake Thunderbird State Park
 Lake Wister State Park
 Natural Falls State Park
 Osage Hills State Park
 Robbers Cave State Park
 Sequoyah State Park
 Tenkiller State Park
 Twin Bridges Area at Grand Lake State Park

See also
 Lake Tenkiller

Notes

References

State parks of Oklahoma
Protected areas of Sequoyah County, Oklahoma
Nature centers in Oklahoma